Monguel  is an Urban Agricultural Commune in Mauritania.

Demographics
5000 people lived in Monguel as of 2000, and there were approximately 6000 living there in 2013. 52.5% of its population were females, and 47.5% were males. 67.5% of its population was rural or nomadic, and the remaining 32.5% was urban.

References

Communes of Mauritania